Facheux Bay (pronounced ['fʊʃi:]) was the location of a small fishing settlement of the same name. In 1901 it had a population of 47. The community was also called Fachier, Facheaux, and Fouche. Facheux Bay is a deep fjord that separates Eastern Head and Western Head of Hermitage Bay, Newfoundland, Canada. The entrance is between two steep falls in high hills. On the west side are three coves with anchorage in 20 to 10 fathoms.

See also
 List of communities in Newfoundland and Labrador

References
 This article includes text incorporated from United States Hydrographic Office & R. G. Davenport's "Newfoundland and Labrador: The coast and banks of Newfoundland and the coast of Labrador, from Grand Point to the Koksoak River, with the adjacent islands and banks" (1884), a publication now in the public domain.

Populated places in Newfoundland and Labrador